Enargia paleacea, the angle-striped sallow, is a moth of the family Noctuidae. It is found in the Palearctic realm from Ireland to Siberia East to Japan.

Description

The wingspan is 40–60 mm. Forewing pale yellowish ochreous, dusted with rufous; the female deeper yellow than the male; inner and outer lines fine, reddish brown; median shade reddish-brown, more diffuse, angulated: subterminal line hardly marked; orbicular and reniform stigmata outlined with reddish brown, the lower lobe of reniform filled up with grey; a series of dark terminal spots; hindwing whitish yellow: ab. angulago Haw. is deep orange instead of pale yellow: teichi Krul. occurring in Germany and W. Russia has the space, between inner and outer lines or between median and submarginal suffused with reddish grey or brown.

Biology
The moth flies from June to October depending on the location.

The larvae feed on birch and sometimes Populus tremula.

References

External links

Angle-striped Sallow at UKmoths
Funet Taxonomy
Lepiforum.de
Vlindernet.nl 

Caradrinini
Moths of Asia
Moths of Europe
Taxa named by Eugenius Johann Christoph Esper